/b/ is an online forum on 4chan.

In the International Phonetic Alphabet, /b/ (and variation) refers to these consonantal stop phonemes:
 , the voiced bilabial plosive, a widespread sound
 , the voiced linguolabial plosive, a rare sound
 , the voiced labiodental plosive, in the Austronesian and Germanic languages
 , the voiced bilabial implosive, a widespread sound
 , the voiceless bilabial implosive, an unstable sound in languages of Africa